The following is a partial list of the "C" codes for Medical Subject Headings (MeSH), as defined by the United States National Library of Medicine (NLM).

This list continues the information at List of MeSH codes (C01). Codes following these are found at List of MeSH codes (C03). For other MeSH codes, see List of MeSH codes.

The source for this content is the set of 2006 MeSH Trees from the NLM.

– virus diseases

– arbovirus infections

– african horse sickness

– bluetongue

– dengue fever
  – dengue hemorrhagic fever

– encephalitis, arbovirus
  – encephalitis, california
  – encephalitis, japanese
  – encephalitis, st. louis
  – encephalitis, tick-borne
  – west nile fever

– encephalomyelitis, equine
  – encephalomyelitis, eastern equine
  – encephalomyelitis, venezuelan equine
  – encephalomyelitis, western equine

– phlebotomus fever

– rift valley fever

– tick-borne diseases
  – african swine fever
  – colorado tick fever
  – encephalitis, tick-borne
  – hemorrhagic fever, crimean
  – hemorrhagic fever, omsk
  – kyasanur forest disease
  – nairobi sheep disease

– yellow fever

– bronchiolitis, viral

– central nervous system viral diseases

– encephalitis
  – encephalitis, viral
  – encephalitis, arbovirus
  – encephalitis, california
  – encephalitis, japanese
  – encephalitis, st. louis
  – encephalitis, tick-borne
  – west nile fever
  – encephalitis, herpes simplex
  – encephalitis, varicella zoster
  – encephalomyelitis, equine
  – encephalomyelitis, eastern equine
  – encephalomyelitis, venezuelan equine
  – encephalomyelitis, western equine
  – leukoencephalopathy, progressive multifocal
  – subacute sclerosing panencephalitis

– meningitis, viral
  – lymphocytic choriomeningitis
  – meningitis, aseptic

– myelitis
  – paraparesis, tropical spastic
  – poliomyelitis
  – poliomyelitis, bulbar
  – postpoliomyelitis syndrome

– poliomyelitis

– pseudorabies

– dna virus infections

– adenoviridae infections
  – adenovirus infections, human
  – hepatitis, infectious canine

– african swine fever

– circoviridae infections

– hepadnaviridae infections
  – hepatitis b
  – hepatitis b, chronic

– herpesviridae infections
  – bell palsy
  – chickenpox
  – cytomegalovirus infections
  – cytomegalovirus retinitis
  – encephalitis, herpes simplex
  – encephalitis, varicella zoster
  – epstein-barr virus infections
  – burkitt lymphoma
  – infectious mononucleosis
  – leukoplakia, hairy
  – herpes simplex
  – herpes genitalis
  – herpes labialis
  – kaposi varicelliform eruption
  – keratitis, herpetic
  – keratitis, dendritic
  – stomatitis, herpetic
  – herpes zoster
  – herpes zoster ophthalmicus
  – herpes zoster oticus
  – zoster sine herpete
  – infectious bovine rhinotracheitis
  – malignant catarrh
  – marek disease
  – pseudorabies
  – roseolovirus infections
  – exanthema subitum
  – sarcoma, kaposi

– papillomavirus infections
  – warts
  – condylomata acuminata
  – epidermodysplasia verruciformis

– papovaviridae infections

– parvoviridae infections
  – aleutian mink disease
  – erythema infectiosum
  – feline panleukopenia

– polyomavirus infections
  – leukoencephalopathy, progressive multifocal

– poxviridae infections
  – cowpox
  – ecthyma, contagious
  – ectromelia, infectious
  – fowlpox
  – lumpy skin disease
  – molluscum contagiosum
  – monkeypox
  – myxomatosis, infectious
  – smallpox
  – vaccinia

– encephalitis, viral

– encephalitis, arbovirus
  – encephalitis, california
  – encephalitis, japanese
  – encephalitis, st. louis
  – encephalitis, tick-borne
  – west nile fever

– encephalitis, herpes simplex

– encephalitis, varicella zoster

– encephalomyelitis, equine
  – encephalomyelitis, eastern equine
  – encephalomyelitis, venezuelan equine
  – encephalomyelitis, western equine

– leukoencephalopathy, progressive multifocal

– subacute sclerosing panencephalitis

– eye infections, viral

– conjunctivitis, viral
  – conjunctivitis, acute hemorrhagic

– cytomegalovirus retinitis

– herpes zoster ophthalmicus

– keratitis, herpetic
  – keratitis, dendritic

– fatigue syndrome, chronic

– hepatitis, viral, animal

– hepatitis, infectious canine

– rift valley fever

– hepatitis, viral, human

– hepatitis a

– hepatitis b
  – hepatitis b, chronic

– hepatitis c
  – hepatitis c, chronic

– hepatitis d
  – hepatitis d, chronic

– hepatitis e

– meningitis, viral

– lymphocytic choriomeningitis

– meningitis, aseptic

– opportunistic infections

– aids-related opportunistic infections

– superinfection

– pneumonia, viral

– rna virus infections

– arenaviridae infections
  – cgi?mode=&term=Hemorrhagic+Fever,+American hemorrhagic fever, american
  – lassa fever
  – lymphocytic choriomeningitis

– astroviridae infections

– birnaviridae infections

– bunyaviridae infections
  – encephalitis, california
  – hantavirus infections
  – hantavirus pulmonary syndrome
  – hemorrhagic fever with renal syndrome
  – hemorrhagic fever, crimean
  – nairobi sheep disease
  – phlebotomus fever
  – rift valley fever

– caliciviridae infections
  – vesicular exanthema of swine

– encephalitis, arbovirus
  – encephalitis, california
  – encephalitis, japanese
  – encephalitis, st. louis
  – encephalitis, tick-borne
  – west nile fever

– flaviviridae infections
  – flavivirus infections
  – dengue fever
  – dengue hemorrhagic fever
  – encephalitis, japanese
  – encephalitis, st. louis
  – encephalitis, tick-borne
  – hemorrhagic fever, omsk
  – kyasanur forest disease
  – louping ill
  – west nile fever
  – yellow fever
  – hepatitis c
  – hepatitis c, chronic
  – pestivirus infections
  – border disease
  – bovine virus diarrhea-mucosal disease
  – classical swine fever
  – hemorrhagic syndrome, bovine

– hemorrhagic fevers, viral
  – dengue fever
  – dengue hemorrhagic fever
  – cgi?mode=&term=Hemorrhagic+Fever,+American hemorrhagic fever, american
  – hemorrhagic fever, crimean
  – hemorrhagic fever, ebola
  – hemorrhagic fever, omsk
  – hemorrhagic fever with renal syndrome
  – kyasanur forest disease
  – lassa fever
  – marburg virus disease
  – rift valley fever

– hepatitis d
  – hepatitis d, chronic

– hepatitis e

– mononegavirales infections
  – borna disease
  – filoviridae infections
  – hemorrhagic fever, ebola
  – marburg virus disease
  – paramyxoviridae infections
  – avulavirus infections
  – newcastle disease
  – henipavirus infections
  – morbillivirus infections
  – distemper
  – measles
  – subacute sclerosing panencephalitis
  – peste-des-petits-ruminants
  – rinderpest
  – respirovirus infections
  – pasteurellosis, pneumonic
  – pneumovirus infections
  – respiratory syncytial virus infections
  – rubulavirus infections
  – mumps
  – rhabdoviridae infections
  – ephemeral fever
  – hemorrhagic septicemia, viral
  – rabies

– nidovirales infections
  – arterivirus infections
  – porcine reproductive and respiratory syndrome
  – coronaviridae infections
  – coronavirus infections
  – enteritis, transmissible, of turkeys
  – feline infectious peritonitis
  – gastroenteritis, transmissible, of swine
  – severe acute respiratory syndrome
  – torovirus infections

– orthomyxoviridae infections
  – influenza, human
  – influenza in birds

– picornaviridae infections
  – cardiovirus infections
  – common cold
  – enterovirus infections
  – conjunctivitis, acute hemorrhagic
  – coxsackievirus infections
  – conjunctivitis, acute hemorrhagic
  – hand, foot and mouth disease
  – herpangina
  – pleurodynia, epidemic
  – echovirus infections
  – encephalomyelitis, enzootic porcine
  – hepatitis a
  – poliomyelitis
  – poliomyelitis, bulbar
  – postpoliomyelitis syndrome
  – swine vesicular disease
  – foot-and-mouth disease

– reoviridae infections
  – african horse sickness
  – bluetongue
  – colorado tick fever
  – rotavirus infections

– retroviridae infections
  – avian leukosis
  – deltaretrovirus infections
  – enzootic bovine leukosis
  – htlv-i infections
  – leukemia-lymphoma, t-cell, acute, htlv-i-associated
  – paraparesis, tropical spastic
  – htlv-ii infections
  – leukemia, t-cell, htlv-ii-associated
  – lentivirus infections
  – equine infectious anemia
  – feline acquired immunodeficiency syndrome
  – hiv infections
  – acquired immunodeficiency syndrome
  – aids arteritis, central nervous system
  – aids-associated nephropathy
  – aids dementia complex
  – aids-related complex
  – aids-related opportunistic infections
  – hiv-associated lipodystrophy syndrome
  – hiv enteropathy
  – hiv seropositivity
  – hiv wasting syndrome
  – pneumonia, progressive interstitial, of sheep
  – simian acquired immunodeficiency syndrome
  – visna
  – leukemia, feline
  – murine acquired immunodeficiency syndrome
  – pulmonary adenomatosis, ovine
  – sarcoma, avian

– togaviridae infections
  – alphavirus infections
  – encephalomyelitis, equine
  – encephalomyelitis, eastern equine
  – encephalomyelitis, venezuelan equine
  – encephalomyelitis, western equine
  – rubivirus infections
  – rubella
  – rubella syndrome, congenital

– sexually transmitted diseases

– sexually transmitted diseases, viral
  – condylomata acuminata
  – herpes genitalis
  – hiv infections
  – acquired immunodeficiency syndrome
  – aids arteritis, central nervous system
  – aids-associated nephropathy
  – aids dementia complex
  – aids-related complex
  – hiv-associated lipodystrophy syndrome
  – hiv enteropathy
  – hiv seropositivity
  – hiv wasting syndrome

– skin diseases, viral

– erythema infectiosum

– exanthema subitum

– herpes simplex
  – herpes labialis
  – kaposi varicelliform eruption

– molluscum contagiosum

– warts
  – condylomata acuminata
  – epidermodysplasia verruciformis

– slow virus diseases

– acquired immunodeficiency syndrome

– aids-related complex

– aleutian mink disease

– equine infectious anemia

– feline acquired immunodeficiency syndrome

– leukoencephalopathy, progressive multifocal

– pneumonia, progressive interstitial, of sheep

– simian acquired immunodeficiency syndrome

– subacute sclerosing panencephalitis

– visna

– tumor virus infections

– avian leukosis

– epstein-barr virus infections
  – burkitt lymphoma

– marek disease

– murine acquired immunodeficiency syndrome

– papillomavirus infections

– pulmonary adenomatosis, ovine

– sarcoma, avian

– warts
  – condylomata acuminata
  – epidermodysplasia verruciformis

– viremia

– zoonoses

The list continues at List of MeSH codes (C03).

C02